Maytenus addat is a species of plant in the family Celastraceae. It is endemic to the Afromontane forests, especially along forest margins, of Ethiopia.

References

addat
Endemic flora of Ethiopia
Trees of Ethiopia
Near threatened flora of Africa
Taxonomy articles created by Polbot
Taxobox binomials not recognized by IUCN